Deep Cover (Music from the Original Motion Picture Soundtrack) is the soundtrack to Bill Duke's 1992 film Deep Cover. It was released on April 4, 1992 through SOLAR Records and consisted of hip hop, reggae and R&B music. The soundtrack peaked at 166 on the Billboard 200 and 9 on the Top R&B/Hip-Hop Albums and featured the popular single "Deep Cover" by Dr. Dre and Snoop Doggy Dogg in his first official appearance on a song.

Track listing 

Notes
The song "It's On", performed by The Lady of Rage, Snoop Doggy Dogg and produced by Dr. Dre, remains unreleased and was listed on the original track listing; however, the song did not make the final cut. There is a rare and low-quality version that leaked on the internet.

Charts

Weekly charts

Year-end charts

References

External links

1992 soundtrack albums
Action film soundtracks
Hip hop soundtracks
SOLAR Records albums
1992 compilation albums
Hip hop compilation albums
Albums produced by Dr. Dre
Albums produced by Rhythum D
Albums produced by Cold 187um
Thriller film soundtracks